Leonardo Mina Polo (born January 5, 1977) is a Colombian soccer player, currently free agent.

References
 Profile at BDFA 

1977 births
Living people
Leonardo Mina Polo
Colombian expatriate footballers
Colombia international footballers
Categoría Primera A players
América de Cali footballers
Atlético Bucaramanga footballers
Atlético Junior footballers
Atlético Nacional footballers
Deportivo Cali footballers
Deportes Tolima footballers
Deportes Quindío footballers
Cortuluá footballers
Cúcuta Deportivo footballers
Club Alianza Lima footballers
Ayacucho FC footballers
Cobresol FBC footballers
S.D. Aucas footballers
Club Atlético Colón footballers
Expatriate footballers in Peru
Expatriate footballers in Ecuador
Expatriate footballers in Argentina
Association football forwards
People from Buenaventura, Valle del Cauca
Sportspeople from Valle del Cauca Department
21st-century Colombian people